Heerz is a genus of braconid wasps in the family Braconidae. There are at least four described species in Heerz, found in Mexico and Central America.

Species
These four species belong to the genus Heerz:
 Heerz ecmahla Martínez, Zaldívar-Riverón, Ceccarelli & Shaw, 2012
 Heerz lukenatcha Marsh, 1993
 Heerz macrophthalma Martínez, Zaldívar-Riverón, Ceccarelli & Shaw, 2012
 Heerz tooya Marsh, 1993

References

Further reading

 

Parasitic wasps